There are two styles of violin playing in India: the Carnatic and the Hindustani. Carnatic violinists such as Malaikkottai Govindaswamy Pillai, Tirukkodikaval Krishna Iyer and Dwaram Venkataswamy Naidu performed concerts as early as the 1900. Indian violinists today such as Manoj George, L. Shankar, Balabhaskar have successfully adapted the Western music style of playing the violin and have been performing concerts outside of India. Violinists such as N. Rajam and Sangeeta Shankar are highly accomplished international performers in the Hindustani style. Violinists such as T.N. Krishnan, A. Kanyakumari, H.K. Venkatram and Mysore brothers have remained Carnatic classical violinists and have yet been able to reach out to audiences outside of India. Also, artists such as Jyotsna Srikanth, L. Subramaniam, Ambi Subramaniam, and Roopa Revathi have satisfactorily managed to perform both Carnatic and Western music on the violin.

The following is a list of famous Indian violinists.

List

Gallery

References

External links 
 Indian violin
 History of Violin in India
 Role of Violin in Carnatic Music
 The Origin and Evolution of Violin – As a Musical Instrument: And Its Contribution to the Progressive Flow of Indian Classical Music

Indian violinists
Indian